Pitrufquén is a Chilean city and commune in Cautín Province, Araucanía Region. The city is located 30 km south of Temuco and lies immediately south of the Toltén River, along Chile Highway 5.

History
Pitrufquén was initially founded as Lisperguer, name that honors the creator of the plane of the urban area, the French engineer Lisperguer.

Demographics
Of these, 13,420 (61%) lived in urban areas and 8,568 (39%) in rural areas.

Pitrufquén's population is characterized as varied because its members have different culture backgrounds, highlighting the historical legacy Spanish and immigrants principally from: France, Italy, Germany, The Netherlands, Austria, Belgium, Switzerland and Hungary. Currently, the largest foreign colony is in "Faja Maisan" composed mostly of descendants of Germans, Dutchmen and Swiss, whose ancestors arrived in La Araucanía between 1905 and 1912.

Since 1898, Pitrufquén begins its development under the impetus of its people and its agricultural potential. Besides immigrants mostly Dutchmen and Germans.

Administration
As a commune, Pitrufquén is a third-level administrative division of Chile administered by a municipal council, headed by an alcalde who is directly elected every four years. The 2008–2012 alcalde is Humberto Catalán Candia (PS).

Within the electoral divisions of Chile, Pitrufquén is represented in the Chamber of Deputies by José Manuel Edwards (RN) and Joaquín Tuma (PDC) as part of the 51st electoral district, together with Carahue, Nueva Imperial, Saavedra, Teodoro Schmidt, Freire and Cholchol. The commune is represented in the Senate by José Garcia Ruminot (RN) and Eugenio Tuma Zedan (PPD) as part of the 15th senatorial constituency (Araucanía-South).

References

 Gobierno Regional de la Araucanía: Pitrufquén

External links
  Municipality of Pitrufquén

Communes of Chile
Populated places in Cautín Province
Mapuche language